Chicago-style pizza is pizza prepared according to several styles developed in Chicago, widely referred to as deep-dish pizza due to its cooking style. The pan in which it is baked gives the pizza its characteristically high edge which provides ample space for large amounts of cheese and a chunky tomato sauce. Chicago-style pizza may be prepared in deep-dish style and as a stuffed pizza.

Deep-dish
According to Tim Samuelson, Chicago's official cultural historian, there is not enough documentation to determine with certainty who invented Chicago-style deep-dish pizza. It is often reported that Chicago-style deep-dish pizza was invented at Pizzeria Uno in Chicago, in 1943, by Uno's founder Ike Sewell. However, a 1956 article from the Chicago Daily News asserts that Uno's original pizza chef Rudy Malnati developed the recipe, and Michele Mohr from the Chicago Tribune reports that the menu at Rosati's Authentic Chicago Pizza has included deep-dish since it opened in 1926, according to the descendants of Saverio Rosati.

Stuffed pizza

By the mid-1970s, two Chicago chains, Nancy's Pizza, founded by Rocco Palese, and Giordano's Pizzeria, operated by brothers Efren and Joseph Boglio, began experimenting with deep-dish pizza and created the stuffed pizza. Palese based his creation on his mother's recipe for scarcedda, an Italian Easter pie from his hometown of Potenza, more commonly known in Italy as pizza rustica Lucana.

Thin-crust pizza

There is also a style of thin-crust pizza found in Chicago and throughout the rest of the Midwest. The crust is thin and firm enough to have a noticeable crunch, unlike a New York-style pizza. While in New York bakers who had immigrated from Italy made pizzas using the traditional method of tossing the dough by hand, the tavern owners who first developed Chicago's thin-crust pizza instead rolled their dough or used mechanical sheeters. This led to thinner crusts than those present in hand-tossed pizzas.

This pizza is cut into squares, also known as "tavern-style" or "party cut", as opposed to wedges. The name "tavern-style" comes from the pizzas originally being served in taverns, often as an enticement to drink alcohol. This origin in taverns is also linked to the pizza's shape, as the square shape of the slices made it possible for taverns that did not have plates to instead set them on napkins.

According to GrubHub data and Chicago Pizza Tours, thin-crust outsells the more widely known deep-dish style among locals. Technomics food industry researcher Darren Tristano has questioned GrubHub's conclusion on the basis of the delivery service's user demographics, and NPR noted that the data would not include information on several deep-dish chains that are not on GrubHub.

Toppings
The typical toppings commonly found on pizzas in most of North America (i.e. sausage, pepperoni, onions, mushrooms, etc) are also standards in Chicago area pizzerias; however, a survey in 2013 indicated that while the most popular pizza topping in the rest of most of the United States is pepperoni, in Chicago, the most popular topping is Italian sausage.

See also
 Pan pizza

References

Further reading
 
 

Cuisine of Chicago
Cuisine of the Midwestern United States
Food and drink introduced in 1943
Pizza in the United States
Pizza styles
Stuffed dishes